The 1904 United States presidential election in New Jersey took place on November 8, 1904. All contemporary 45 states were part of the 1904 United States presidential election. New Jersey voters chose 12 electors to the Electoral College, which selected the president and vice president.

New Jersey was won by the Republican nominees, incumbent President Theodore Roosevelt of New York and his running mate incumbent Vice President Charles W. Fairbanks of Indiana. Roosevelt and Fairbanks defeated the Democratic nominees, Chief Judge of the New York Court of Appeals Alton B. Parker of New York and his running mate Senator Henry G. Davis of West Virginia  Also in the running was the Socialist Party candidate, Eugene V. Debs, who ran with Ben Hanford.

Roosevelt carried New Jersey with 56.68% of the vote to Parker's 38.05%, a victory margin of 18.63%.

Eugene Debs came in a distant third, with 2.22%.

Like much of the Northeast, New Jersey in the early decades of the 20th century was a staunchly Republican state, having not given a majority of the vote to a Democratic presidential candidate since 1892. While winning a landslide victory nationwide, Roosevelt easily held New Jersey in the Republican column in 1904.

On the county level map, Roosevelt carried 17 of the state's 21 counties, breaking 60% of the vote in 7 counties. Parker's most significant win was urban Hudson County, which he won along with the 3 rural counties in western North Jersey, Warren, Sussex, and Hunterdon, which had long been non-Yankee Democratic enclaves in the otherwise Republican Northeast.

Amidst Roosevelt's nationwide landslide, New Jersey's election result in 1904 made the state less than 1% more Democratic than the national average. Roosevelt's victory in New Jersey was underwhelming in part because of Alton Parker's popularity in the New York City area, his victory in New York City spilling over to allow him to win heavily populated urban Hudson County, New Jersey just across the Hudson River, which is part of the New York City metro area.

Results

Results by county

See also
 Presidency of Theodore Roosevelt
 United States presidential elections in New Jersey

References

New Jersey
1904
1904 New Jersey elections